Oriximiná is the westernmost and second-largest (by territorial area) municipality in the Brazilian state of Pará. It is also the fourth-largest in the country.

Location

The city is crossed by the Equator.

Conservation

The north of the municipality contains the larger part (75.89%) of the  Grão-Pará Ecological Station, the largest fully protected tropical forest conservation unit on the planet.
The municipality also contains the  Rio Trombetas Biological Reserve, a strictly protected conservation unit created in 1979 to preserve the ecology and specifically to protect the Arrau turtle.
The municipality contains part of the Saracá-Taquera National Forest, a  sustainable-use conservation unit created in 1989.
It contains 88% of the  Trombetas State Forest, created in 2006.

References 

Municipalities in Pará
Populated places established in 1877
1877 establishments in Brazil